Samantha Jane Lofton (born April 29, 1992) is an American former soccer defender who last played for Breiðablik UBK of Úrvalsdeild kvenna, and previously played for Boston Breakers and Portland Thorns FC of National Women's Soccer League.

College career
Coming from a standout career in high school where she earned several honors. Sam Lofton debuted for James Madison Dukes in 2010. Along her entire career at Dukes, Lofton recorded a total of 80 appearances with six goals. She also earned several important honors, such as being named to CAA All-Academic team in 2013 and 2014, to the First Team All-CAA honoree in 2014 and Second Team NSCAA All-Mid-Atlantic Region honoree in 2014.

Club career
After spending some time with Washington Spirit Reserves in the W-League and helping the team to reach the W-League Final for the first time, she was picked by Boston Breakers in the 20th overall of the 2015 NWSL College Draft and became the first James Madison University player to be drafted by a NWSL team.

In 2016 Lofton went to Portland Thorns. In the same year, she signed with Sunnanå SK of Damallsvenskan, the highest women's soccer division in Sweden.

In 2017, Lofton played for Breiðablik UBK of Úrvalsdeild kvenna in the first division of Iceland.

Post-soccer career 
Lofton is now a meditation counselor.

References

External links
 
 Lofton's Profile at James Madison Dukes

Living people
1992 births
People from Lock Haven, Pennsylvania
James Madison Dukes women's soccer players
Boston Breakers draft picks
Boston Breakers players
Portland Thorns FC players
Sunnanå SK players
Sam Lofton
National Women's Soccer League players
Women's association football defenders
American women's soccer players
American expatriate women's soccer players
American expatriate sportspeople in Sweden
Expatriate women's footballers in Sweden
American expatriate sportspeople in Iceland
Expatriate women's footballers in Iceland